Amblyodipsas katangensis, or the Katanga purple-glossed snake, is a species of rear-fanged venomous snake in the family Lamprophiidae. The species is endemic to Africa.

Subspecies
Two subspecies are recognized as being valid, including the nominotypical subspecies.
Amblyodipsas katangensis ionidesi 
Amblyodipsas katangensis katangensis

Geographic range
A. katangensis katangensis is found in the Democratic Republic of the Congo and Zambia. A. katangensis ionidesi is found in Tanzania.

Etymology
The subspecific name, ionidesi, is in honor of British game warden Constantine John Philip Ionides (1901–1968), who was known as the "Snake Man of British East Africa".

Reproduction
A. katangensis is oviparous.

Further reading
de Witte GF, Laurent R (1942). "Contribution à la Faune Herpétologique du Congo belge ". Rev. Zool. Bot. Africaines 36 (2): 101–115. (Amblyodipsas katangensis, new species, p. 113). (in French).
Branch, Bill (2005). A Photographic Guide to Snakes, Other Reptiles and Amphibians of East Africa. Cape Town: Struik. p. 67.

Atractaspididae
Snakes of Africa
Reptiles of the Democratic Republic of the Congo
Reptiles of Tanzania
Reptiles of Zambia
Taxa named by Raymond Laurent
Taxa named by Gaston-François de Witte
Reptiles described in 1942